Écouves is a commune in the department of Orne, northwestern France. The municipality was established on 1 January 2016 by merger of the former communes of Forges, Radon (the seat) and Vingt-Hanaps. It takes its name from the nearby Forêt d'Écouves.

See also 
Communes of the Orne department

References 

Communes of Orne
Populated places established in 2016
2016 establishments in France